Coca-Cola Light Sango is a blood-orange flavoured variety of Coca-Cola Light/Diet Coke produced by The Coca-Cola Company, available in France since mid-2005. It was the first variety of Coca-Cola to have been developed outside of the company's Atlanta, Georgia, headquarters, primarily due to Belgium's reputation as the world's top consumer of Coke Light products per capita. Coke Sango's production is also due, in part, to the success of previous citrus-flavoured varieties of Coke Light in Europe.

Coke Sango's name is based on sang, the French word for blood, in reference to its blood orange flavouring.

Produced in France and Belgium, the drink was discontinued in 2008. In early 2018, Coca-Cola released a similar drink for the U.S. and Canada, named "Zesty Blood Orange". Other variants of the Diet Coke released that year included lime, mango and cherry.

References

Diet drinks
Coca-Cola cola brands
Food and drink introduced in 2005
Orange sodas